Charles F. Hall (1918 – August 10, 1974) was an American politician from Charlotte, North Carolina who was involved within the politics of Florida. He was the inaugural mayor of Metropolitan Dade County from 1964 to 1970, and the mayor of Miami Beach from 1971 until his death in 1974.

His first job in Florida politics was as a member of the Dade County Commission, when he was elected in 1956. Hall ran for office in 1963, where he faced no opposition to become the inaugural mayor of Metropolitan Dade County. He resigned as mayor of Dade County in 1970, in order to run for governor of Florida, but finished last in the primaries with 18.36% of the vote. He would later be elected as the mayor of Miami Beach, and at the time of his death, was about to resign so he could run for Dade County mayor again.

References

1918 births
1974 deaths
Mayors of Miami Beach, Florida
Mayors of Miami-Dade County, Florida
20th-century American politicians
People from Charlotte, North Carolina